Michael Valiante (born November 11, 1979, in New Westminster, British Columbia) is a Canadian racing driver.

Formula racing 

Valiante began racing in karting where his success earned him a full-season scholarship in the Skip Barber 2.0 Series. In his first season, Valiante was both series champion and rookie of the year. Following this success he moved on the Barber Dodge Pro Series and then to the Toyota Atlantic Championship.

Driving for the Lynx Racing team in 2001, Valiante was able to finish eighth in the series championship despite competing in only five events. His performance impressed Lynx enough to sign him for two more seasons.  2002 was Valiante's best year in the series. He won three races and led the points going into the final round in Denver, only to struggle in the race and lose the championship to Jon Fogarty. Valiante led the series early in 2003. However, his championship hopes were dashed when he missed the fourth round at Mazda Raceway Laguna Seca due to an illness.  He went on to finish third in the championship and again scored three victories.

Valiante was set to make his debut in Champ Car at California Speedway in 2003, but the race was cancelled due to wildfires in the area. It was not until a year later that he made his first Champ Car start in Mexico City. His second start came at Portland in 2005 as a one-off drive for Dale Coyne Racing.  He was not able to secure a full-time ride in the series due to his lack of financial backing.

Sports car racing 

In 2006, Valiante competed full-time with Finlay motorsports in the Grand-Am Rolex Sports Car Series, where he and co-driver Rob Finlay finished ninth in the final standings. In 2008 he switched to SunTrust Racing to partner Max Angelelli in a DP class Dallara Pontiac, winning at Sonoma.

The Canadian joined Michael Shank Racing for the 2009 Rolex Sports Car Series. Driving a Riley Ford with John Pew as co-driver, he collected two podiums and resulted seventh in the DP drivers standings. In 2010 he partnered Brian Frisselle at the Shank team. With a best result of third, he finished ninth in the standings.

In 2012 he alternated between the Rolex Sports Car Series and American Le Mans Series. He started five Rolex races, winning at Mid-Ohio with teammate Richard Westbrook. In ALMS he competed in five rounds with JDX Racing in the GTC class, collecting three third-place finishes.

The driver returned to Michael Shank Racing for the 2013 Rolex Sports Car Series, having John Pew has teammate during most races. He collected two second-place finishes and resulted 15th in the DP standings.

In 2014, Valiante moved to Spirit of Daytona to race at the merged United SportsCar Championship. in the Spirit of Daytona Corvette Daytona Prototype with Richard Westbrook and Mike Rockenfeller.

Stock car racing 

In 2007, Valiante made a NASCAR Busch Series start driving the No. 42 Dodge from Chip Ganassi Racing at Circuit Gilles Villeneuve. Valiante started 21st and finished 34th.

Motorsports career results

Complete American open-wheel racing results
(key) (Races in bold indicate pole position) (Races in italics indicate fastest lap)

Barber Dodge Pro Series

Atlantic Championship

Champ Car World Series

NASCAR
(key) (Bold – Pole position awarded by qualifying time. Italics – Pole position earned by points standings or practice time. * – Most laps led.)

Busch Series

24 Hours of Daytona results

Complete IMSA SportsCar Championship results
(key) (Races in bold indicate pole position, Results are overall/class)

See also
List of Canadians in Champ Car

External links
Official site
 
 Michael Valiante at Driver Database
 Michael Valiante at Race Database
 Michael Valiante at Speedsport Magazine

References

1979 births
Living people
Racing drivers from British Columbia
Canadian racing drivers
People from New Westminster
Champ Car drivers
NASCAR drivers
Atlantic Championship drivers
Rolex Sports Car Series drivers
24 Hours of Daytona drivers
WeatherTech SportsCar Championship drivers
Barber Pro Series drivers
Chip Ganassi Racing drivers
Walker Racing drivers
Dale Coyne Racing drivers
Meyer Shank Racing drivers
Wayne Taylor Racing drivers
Starworks Motorsport drivers
Michelin Pilot Challenge drivers